Stizoides is a genus of kleptoparasitic sand wasps in the family Crabronidae. There are at least 30 described species in Stizoides.

Species

References

Further reading

 
 
 

Crabronidae